"The Ghost in You" is a song by English rock band the Psychedelic Furs, written by the band's lead vocalist Richard Butler and bassist Tim Butler. It was the second single from the band's fourth studio album, Mirror Moves (1984). As a single it peaked at No. 59 on the US Billboard Hot 100, number 68 on the UK Singles Chart, and number 85 in Canada.
British filmmaker Tim Pope directed the song's official music video.

Track listing
12" Single (Columbia – 44-04984)
"The Ghost in You" (Full Length Version)" – 4:17
"Heartbeat (New York Remix)" – 8:15

12" Single (Columbia – 38 04416)
"The Ghost in You" – 3:38
"Heartbeat (Remix)" – 5:10

References

External links
 

1984 singles
The Psychedelic Furs songs
Counting Crows songs
1984 songs
Columbia Records singles
Songs written by Tim Butler
Songs written by Richard Butler (singer)